Jack Hooper may refer to:
 Jack Hooper (intelligence officer)
 Jack Hooper (artist)